Tetraglenes setosa is a species of beetle in the family Cerambycidae. Its distribution can be found in Kenya. It was described by Breuning in 1942.

References

Agapanthiini
Beetles described in 1942